Birgir Jakobsson (born 21 March 1948) is an Icelandic doctor and former basketball player. He was a member of the Icelandic national basketball team from 1966 to 1976. Following a 20-year stay as a doctor and later director at the Karolinska University Hospital, he was the Director of Health of Iceland from 2015 to 2018.

Early life
Birgir was born in Reykjavík to Jakob Tryggvason and Ragnheiður Jónsdóttir.

Basketball

Club career
Born in Reykjavík, Birgir started playing basketball at the age of 10. He played his first senior games with ÍR in 1964. In December, he was part of the first Icelandic team to participate in a continental competition when he scored a game high 16 points in a 71–17 victory against the Collegians in the FIBA European Champions Cup (now EuroLeague). In the second game between the teams later in the month, he scored 26 points in ÍR's 63–47 victory. In 1972, he was named the league's best player.

In 1972 he played for ÍR against Real Madrid in the FIBA European Champions Cup.

National team career
From 1966 to 1976, Birgir played 24 games for the Icelandic national team.

Awards, titles and accomplishments

Individual awards
Úrvalsdeild Player of the Year: 1972

Titles
Úrvalsdeild karla (7): 1964, 1969, 1970, 1971, 1972, 1973, 1975

References

1948 births
Living people
Birgir Jakobsson
Birgir Jakobsson
Birgir Jakobsson